

Events 
 January–March 
 January 3 – With the end of latest of the Savoyard–Waldensian wars in the Duchy of Savoy between the Savoyard government and Protestant Italians known as the Waldensians, Victor Amadeus III, Duke of Savoy, carries out the release of 3,847 surviving prisoners and their families, who had forcibly been converted to Catholicism, and permits the group to emigrate to Switzerland.
 January 8 – Richard Talbot, 1st Earl of Tyrconnell, is appointed as the last Lord Deputy of Ireland by the English crown, and begins efforts to include more Roman Catholic Irishmen in the administration. Upon the removal of King James II in England and Scotland, the Earl of Tyrconnell loses his job and is replaced by James, who reigns briefly as King of Ireland until William III establishes his rule over the isle.
 January 27 – In one of the most sensational cases in England in the 17th century, midwife Mary Hobry murders her abusive husband, Denis Hobry, after he beats her up for the last time. Mary then dismembers his body and scatters the remains in a dunghill and in several outhouses (or privies) in the area.  Despite a defense of justifiable homicide, Mary is convicted of murder and burned at the stake.
 February 7 – The Arjeplog blasphemy trial begins for Erik Eskilsson and Amund Thorsson, two practitioners of the Sami religion who had resisted Sweden's efforts at their conversion to Christianity.  Eskilsson and Thorsson are acquitted of the charges after agreeing to convert to Christianity.
 February 11 – In India, troops under the command of Job Charnock of the East India Company, preparing to go to war against the Nawab of Bengal, Shaista Khan of the Mughal empire, destroy his fortresses located at Thana.  
 February 12 – The Declaration of Indulgence is issued in Scotland by King James VII as one of the first steps in establishing freedom of religion in the British Isles, eliminating enforcement of criminal penalties against persons who failed to conform with Anglicanism.  As King James II of England, he issues a similar declaration on April 4.
 March 19 – The men under explorer Robert Cavelier, Sieur de La Salle mutiny, while searching for the mouth of the Mississippi River.   Pierre Duhaut murders La Salle, near what is now Navasota, Texas.

 April–June 
 April 4 – King James II of England issues the Declaration of Indulgence (or Declaration for the Liberty of Conscience), suspending laws against Roman Catholics and nonconformists.
 April 23 – Ignatius George II becomes Syriac Orthodox Patriarch of Antioch (or April 22).
 April 26 – The Spanish city of Guayaquil (now part of Ecuador) is attacked and looted by English and French pirates under the command of George Hout (English) and Pierre Le Picard and Francois Groniet (French).   Of more than 260 pirates, 35 are killed and 46 were wounded; 75 defenders of the city died and more than 100 are wounded.
 May 6 – Emperor Higashiyama succeeds Emperor Reigen, on the throne of Japan.
 June 14 – In one of the few actions on land in the Anglo-Siamese War, English sailors on the coast of Mergui in Burma (now Myeik, Myanmar) are massacred by Siamese troops.

 July–December 
 July 11 – Isaac Newton's Philosophiæ Naturalis Principia Mathematica, known as the Principia, is published by the Royal Society of London. In it, Newton describes his law of universal gravitation, explains the laws of mechanics, and gives a formula for the speed of sound. The writing of Principia Mathematica ushers in a tidal wave of changes in thought, significantly accelerating the scientific revolution by providing new and practical intellectual tools, and becomes the foundation of modern physics.
 July 24 – Morean War: Battle of Patras – The Republic of Venice defeats the Ottomans, which flee in panic, allowing the Venetians to capture the fortresses of Patras, Rio, Antirrio, and Lepanto unopposed.
 August 12 – Great Turkish War: Battle of Mohács – The Habsburg imperial army, and allies under Charles V, Duke of Lorraine, defeat the Ottoman Turks, and enable Austria to conquer most of Ottoman-occupied Hungary.
 September 21 – Morean War: The navy of the Republic of Venice raids the Dalmatian coast, and attacks Ottoman Turkish strongholds in Greece.
 September 22 – The Siege of Golconda, ordered by Emperor Aurangzeb of India's Mughal Empire against the capital of the Golconda sultanate, ends after nine months when a traitor inside the walled city, Sarandaz Khan, opens the first of several entrances into the fortress.  The Sultan Abul Hasan Qutb Shah is taken prisoner by General Mir Shahab ud-Din, and Golconda (now part of Hyderabad in the Telangana state). 
 September 26 – Half of the Parthenon is destroyed in Athens after mortar shells are fired by Republic of Venice forces under the command of Francesco Morosini in a battle against the Ottoman Empire for control of the city. The strike ignites a stock of gunpowder that the Ottomans had stored inside the 2,200-year-old temple, which had been completed in 438 BC as a shrine to the goddess Athena. During the fighting September 23 and September 29 for control of the Acropolis in the Morean War, the Temple of Athena Nike is demolished and the Propylaea suffers damage.

 October–December 
 October 31 – The legend of the Charter Oak begins as a successful attempt to hide the 1662 Royal Charter of the British colony (and now a U.S. state) of Connecticut after Edmund Andros, the Governor of the Dominion of New England, makes a mission of attempting to confiscate the founding documents for the seven colonies that make up the new administrative area.  After Governor Andros arrives in Hartford and comes to the tavern of Zachariah Sanford to demand the Connecticut Colony charter, Captain Joseph Wadsworth spirits the parchment away from the and hides the Charter in a hollowed out portion of a white oak tree on Wyllys Hyll until Andros is recalled to London.  
 November 8 – Suleiman II succeeds the deposed Mehmed IV, as Ottoman Emperor.
 December 31 – In response to the revocation of the Edict of Nantes in 1685, a group of Huguenots set sail from France, and settle in the recently established Dutch colony at the Cape of Good Hope, where, using their native skills, they establish the first South African vineyards.

Births 

 January 27 – Johann Balthasar Neumann, German architect (d. 1753)
 February 4 – Joseph Effner, German architect (d. 1745) 
 March 7 – Jean Lebeuf, French historian (d. 1760)
 March 16 – Sophia Dorothea of Hanover, queen consort of Frederick William I (d. 1757)
 May 12 – Johann Heinrich Schulze, German professor and polymath (d. 1744)
 June 24 – Johann Albrecht Bengel, German scholar (d. 1752)
 September 7 – Durastante Natalucci, Italian historian (d. 1772)
 October 4 – Robert Simson, Scottish mathematician (d. 1768)
 October 5 – Maria Maddalena Martinengo, Italian nun (d. 1737) 
 October 21 – Nicolaus I Bernoulli, Swiss mathematician (d. 1759)
 November 7 – William Stukeley, English archaeologist (d. 1765)
 December 5 – Francesco Geminiani, Italian violinist and composer (d. 1762)
 December 26 – Johann Georg Pisendel, German musician (d. 1755)
 date unknown
 Gabriel de Clieu, French naval officer and governor of Guadeloupe (1737-1752) (d. 1774) 
 Shahzada Assadullah Khan Abdali, Persian Governor of Herat (d. 1720)

Deaths 

 January 13 – Jean Claude, French Protestant clergyman (b. 1619)
 January 28 – Johannes Hevelius, Polish astronomer (b. 1611)
 January 31 – Francisco Varo, Spanish linguist (b. 1627)
 February 15 – Marie Elisabeth of Brunswick-Wolfenbüttel, German noblewoman (b. 1638)
 February 16 – Charles Cotton, English poet and writer (b. 1630)
 February 22 – Jean Hamon, French doctor and writer (b. 1618)
 February 26 – Magdalena Elisabeth of Hanau, German noblewoman (b. 1611)
 March 19 – René-Robert Cavelier, Sieur de La Salle, French explorer (b. 1643)
 March 20 – Margravine Magdalene Sibylle of Brandenburg-Bayreuth, Electress of Saxony by marriage (b. 1612)
 March 20 – Marie Eleonore of Dietrichstein, Countess of Kaunitz and Oppersdorf (b. 1623)
 March 22 – Jean-Baptiste Lully, French composer, established opera in France (b. 1632)
 March 28 – Constantijn Huygens, Dutch poet and composer (b. 1596)
 April 12 – Ambrose Dixon, Virginia Colony pioneer (b. c. 1628)
 April 16 – George Villiers, 2nd Duke of Buckingham, English statesman (b. 1628)
 April 20 – Richard Olmsted, Connecticut settler (b. 1612)
 April 23 – Ferdinand Albert I, Duke of Brunswick-Lüneburg (b. 1636)
 April 25 – Johannes Caioni, Transylvanian Franciscan friar (b. 1629)
 July 19 – Laura Martinozzi, Duchess consort of Modena (b. 1639)
 August 9 – Niccolò Albergati-Ludovisi, Italian Catholic cardinal (b. 1608)
 September 1 – Henry More, English philosopher (b. 1614)
 September 12 – John Alden, English-born Mayflower crewman (b. c. 1599)
 September 28 – Francis Turretin, Swiss theologian (b. 1623)
 October 13 – Geminiano Montanari, Italian astronomer (b. 1633)
 October 19 – Giulio Bartolocci, Italian Biblical scholar (b. 1613)
 October 21 – Edmund Waller, English poet (b. 1606)
 October 24 – Countess Palatine Maria Eufrosyne of Zweibrücken, Swedish princess (b. 1625)
 November 4
 Jacques Leneuf de La Poterie, Norman nobleman, seigneur and fur trader in New France (b. 1604)
 Johanna Walpurgis of Leiningen-Westerburg, German noblewoman, by marriage Duchess of Saxe-Weissenfels (b. 1647)
 November 6 – Charles de Grimaldi-Régusse, French aristocrat (b. 1612)
 November 14 – Nell Gwyn, English actress, a mistress of Charles II of England (b. 1650)
 November 18 – Anton Janson, Dutch typefounder and printer (b. 1620)
 December 10 – Horatio Townshend, 1st Viscount Townshend, English viscount (b. 1630)
 December 16 – Sir William Petty, English philosopher, scientist and economist (b. 1623)
 date unknown – Josias Fendall, Colonial governor of Maryland (b. c. 1628)

References